Friendship Park may refer to:

 Friendship Park (Bloomingdale, New Jersey)
 Friendship Park (Cerritos, California)
 Friendship Park (San Diego–Tijuana)
 Friendship "Turtle" Park, Washington, DC
 Sheger Park